Jorge Eduardo García Bustos (born 22 April 1987 in La Serena) is a Chilean weightlifter. He competed at the 2012 Summer Olympics in the -105 kg event.

At the 2010 South American Games, in Medellin, he took fourth place in the clean and jerk.  That same year he finished 11th in the Pan American Games held in Guatemala.  In 2011, at the Pan American Games in Guadalajara he was in 6th place. His best results to date were in 153 kilos in the snatch and clean and jerk at 190. García won the  – 105 bronze medal in clean and jerk during the 2014 Pan American Sports Festival.

Londres 2012 
In London, came in 13th position after reaching the 15th position in the snatch with 150 kilos, and 13th in the clean and jerk with 191 kilos.

References

Chilean male weightlifters
Olympic weightlifters of Chile
Weightlifters at the 2012 Summer Olympics
1987 births
Living people
Weightlifters at the 2011 Pan American Games
Pan American Games competitors for Chile
People from La Serena
20th-century Chilean people
21st-century Chilean people